A trống đế or trống chầu is a traditional Vietnamese musical instrument also known as "praise drums". It is a small double-headed drum, beaten with a long wooden stick on the top side, causing a loud snapping sound.

Description
The two sides of the trống chầu where they are beaten, are made with buffalo hide. The main portion of the drum is carved from jack fruit wood

Uses
The drummer is typically a well-recognized member of the audience and beats rhythms at the beginning and end of a performance, to mark singing phrases, and as means of appreciation for a performance. It is the largest of the set of drums used in ca trù- the Vietnamese traditional chamber music. Performers also use it in a chèo or hát văn.

References

External links
Drum Lessons

Vietnamese musical instruments
Drums